Kent Cullers (July 21, 1949 – July 17, 2021) was an American astronomer, who was a manager of SETI's Project Phoenix. In 2005, he retired from the SETI Institute.

Early life and education 
Cullers was born in July 1949 in El Reno, Oklahoma, the son of an oil field engineer. His birth was premature and to save his life he was placed in an incubator filled with pure oxygen. The excess oxygen damaged his retinas, leaving him totally blind. His father, a physicist, read astronomy books to Cullers as a child, influencing the boy's later aspirations. He grew up in Temple City, California, where he was a highly ranked student. He first studied psychology at  Pomona College, but against great resistance changed his major to physics midway through college. He received his PhD. in physics from the University of California, Berkeley in 1980. He is the first totally blind physicist in the United States, and is believed to be the first astronomer who was blind from birth (although some astronomers have become blind in their old age, most notably Galileo Galilei).

Career 
Kent Cullers worked for NASA's Search for Extraterrestrial Intelligence (SETI) program upon graduating from Berkeley. From 1985 to 1990, he was the Targeted Search Signal Detection Team Leader with the SETI Institute. He developed advanced computer algorithms for detection of continuous and pulsed signals originating from distant Earth-like planets.

From 1990 to March 1994, he was the signal detection subsystem manager for the High Resolution Microwave Survey (HRMS) Project at NASA Ames Research Center, Moffett Field, California. He supervised the development of hardware and software for signal detection for HRMS. From 1993 to March 1994, Cullers led the SETI Research & Technology effort and managed the upgrading and replication of all the digital data processing equipment for HRMS. NASA's HRMS Project was cancelled by the United States Congress in October 1993, but Cullers still participated in Project Phoenix, the SETI Institute's continuation of the Targeted Search portion of HRMS. He resigned from NASA in October 1995, and rejoined the SETI Institute as a senior scientist and project manager for Project Phoenix. Dr. Cullers retired from the SETI Institute in 2005.

Minor planet 35056 Cullers is named in his honor.

In popular culture 
Kent Cullers was the subject of a short documentary film produced by his wife, photographer Lisa Powers. In 1997, he was portrayed by actor William Fichtner as the fictional character Kent Clark in the movie Contact.

References 

1949 births
Living people
People from El Reno, Oklahoma
American blind people
Blind academics
Pomona College alumni
University of California, Berkeley alumni
American astronomers
Search for extraterrestrial intelligence
Scientists with disabilities